Krasnogorsky zavod is a Russian factory in Krasnogorsk near Moscow which specializes in optical technology. Part of Shvabe Holding (Rostec state corporation).

During the Soviet period it was called Krasnogorsk Mechanical Works. The abbreviation KMZ is still in common use.

Products 
KMZ is known largely for its photographic and movie cameras of the Zorki, Zenit and Krasnogorsk series, several million of which were produced.  It also has a large military optics and mechanical engineering division.

History

Founding and post-war years 

After the German invasion of the Soviet Union in World War II, the Red Army had acute need for precision optical instruments. The existing factories were either inaccessible, such as LOMO in besieged Leningrad, or overloaded with demand, such as FED which had just been evacuated from Kharkiv to Berdsk. The KMZ factory was set up in 1942 near Moscow, which by then was no longer in immediate danger from German troops, on the site of a recently evacuated mechanical plant.  Initially the company took over production of scopes and binoculars as well as reconnaissance cameras.

After the end of the war, KMZ began producing photographic lenses in 1945 to the specifications of the Carl Zeiss corporation, whose factory in Jena had been overrun by the Red Army and largely carted off as war reparations.

1950s and 1960s: Years of creativity 

The mid-1950s saw the beginning of a period of heightened R&D activity at KMZ.  

During this period, KMZ  also produced the world's first  subminiature SLR camera, the  Narciss, an all-metal camera using  16mm  unperforated film in special cassette,  frame size  14x21mm. Narciss has a
focal plane shutter, speed B,1/2,1/5,1/10,1/25,1/50,1/125,1/250 and 1/500 sec.

1970s and 1980s: Catering to the domestic market 

The pace of R&D for consumer products at KMZ substantially slowed down at the end of the 1960s. During the 1970s consumer production at KMZ shifted towards producing large numbers of individual, relatively simple models of the existing product lines.

Since the 1990s: Collapse and reconstruction 

After the collapse of the Soviet Union, KMZ production was largely in disarray.  Now, it is a group member of the multi-national Russian Shvabe Holding.

Logo 

Before 1949 the KMZ logo was a simple dove prism, nicknamed "tomb" by factory workers. In 1949 the logo was changed to the present form, depicting a prism with a refracted ray of light.

References

Select bibliography

External links 
 Official company website (in Russian)
 Actual company photographic products (in Russian)
 Website of the company's photography and R&D division (in Russian)
 Complete list of KMZ camera products (in English)
 List of KMZ lenses (in Russian)

Manufacturing companies of the Soviet Union
Optics manufacturing companies
Photography companies of Russia
Photography in the Soviet Union
Soviet photographic lenses
Defence companies of the Soviet Union
Movie camera manufacturers
Krasnogorsky District, Moscow Oblast
Shvabe Holding
Companies based in Moscow Oblast